Johnstown-Monroe High School is a public high school in Johnstown, Ohio.  It is the only high school in the Johnstown-Monroe Local School District. It was erected in 2018 and currently houses grades 9-12.  The current principal is Mr. Derick Busenburg. The district superintendent is Philip Wagner.

Enrollment fluctuates around 540 students. In recent years, the enrollment has risen in completion of the new school buildings which  opened during the second semester of the 2017-18 school year.

Athletics 
Johnstown Monroe High School has many athletic teams in which students can participate.  These include soccer, band, cheerleading, football, softball, baseball, track and field, basketball, lacrosse, golf, wrestling, and cross country. 

In years past, Johnstown has had very successful sports teams with many making it to the regional playoffs.

References

External links

High schools in Licking County, Ohio
Public high schools in Ohio